Aaron Jacob Weinstein (born July 31, 1985), is an American musician.

Music career
While still attending New Trier High School in Winnetka, Illinois, Weinstein founded the Stephane Grappelli Tribute Trio, which was named best high school instrumental jazz group by Down Beat magazine in 2002.  He attended the Berklee College of Music in Boston, Massachusetts on a four-year scholarship.
 
When he was 19, he recorded his debut album, A Handful of Stars (Arbors, 2005), featuring Bucky Pizzarelli, John Pizzarelli, Nicki Parrott, Houston Person, and Joe Ascione. He has also recorded with Frank Vignola and J. Geils.

Discography

References

External links
 Official site

American jazz violinists
American male violinists
People from Wilmette, Illinois
Living people
New Trier High School alumni
1985 births
Jazz musicians from Illinois
21st-century American violinists
21st-century American male musicians
American male jazz musicians
Arbors Records artists